Ayman Baalbaki (born 1975) is a Lebanese painter. He studied at the Lebanese University and at the École nationale supérieure des arts décoratifs in Paris. His large-scale expressionist portraits of fighters made him one of the most popular young Arab artists.

Painting
Born the year the civil war started in Lebanon, Ayman Baalbaki draws most of his inspiration from these events. His paintings often depict destroyed buildings, sometimes occupied by refugees who were forced to leave their homes during the combats. After the 2006 Lebanon War he drew series of scattered structures related to the demolitions consecutive to the bombings of Beirut's southern suburbs.

Ayman Baalbaki's most popular series depict warriors bearing veils or casks. These portraits of anonymous figures became a symbol of the endless conflicts in the Middle East. These paintings have been widely exhibited worldwide, including the 2011 Venice Biennale.
In 2012, Baalbaki participated in Hoods for Heritage, a project consisting of 16 Porsche 911 hoods transformed into art works by artists and designer and auctioned on benefit of the Beirut National Museum.

Installation works
Although better known as a painter, Ayman Baalbaki produced notable installation works. While at École nationale supérieure des arts décoratifs, he presented Les Frigos (2001) a container enclosing a luggage. Nomadism is a recurrent theme in his work and will appear in more recent works such as Destination X, that was featured in Arabicity (2010) an exhibition curated by Rose Issa in Liverpool’s Bluecoat and Beirut’s Beirut Exhibition Center. Destination X is an old Mercedes Benz red car, reminding Lebanon’s antique taxis service, loaded with a mountain of luggage as a symbol of the upheaval caused by the war.

Auctions
Ayman Baalbaki, who is represented by Saleh Barakat's Agial Art Gallery in Beirut has witnessed growing success in auction sales:
In March 2009, a Abel was presented at an Auction Doha with an estimate of US$20,000–30,000 and was sold for $60,000. In October 2009, an untitled painting was proposed Dubai for US$15,000–20,000 and was sold for $74,500. In April 2011, Let A Thousand Flowers Bloom was proposed, also in Dubai, for US$50,000–70,000 and was hammered for $206,500. In April 2013, a new record was set as "Ya'ilahi" (Dear Lord) went to US$377,000 at Sotheby's. In March 2014, A large painting entitled "Babel" was presented at Christies with an estimation of $150,000–200,000; It realized $485,000.

Awards
 Empreintes (first prize), organized by Maraya Gallery and Lebanese Ministry of Culture and Higher Education, Beirut, Lebanon, 1996
 Cm ³(first prices), CIUP, France, 2003
 Jeux de la francophonie 2005  Silver Medal (painting), Niamey, Niger

Publications
Ayman Baalbaki, Transfiguration Apocalyptique, Agial Art Gallery 2008
Can one man save the (art world), Georges Rabbath and Nayla Tamraz, Alarm Editions 2009
Beirut and Again and Again, edited by Rose Issa, Beyond Art Productions, 2012

Selected exhibitions

Solo exhibitions
Transfiguration Apocalyptique, Agial Art Gallery, Beirut 2008
Ceci n'est pas la Suisse, Rose Issa Projects, London, 2009
Beirut Again and Again, Rose Issa Projects, London, 2011
Recent Works, Rose Issa Projects, London, 2014
Blowback, Saleh Barakat Gallery, Beirut, 2016

Group exhibitions
Contemporary Art Encounter: Imagining the Book, Bibliotheca Alexandrina, Alexandria, 2002.
CM3, Cité Internationale Universitaire, Paris, 2003
Thirty: Ayman Baalbaki and Sheelagh Colcough, Studio 4-11, Belfast, 2005
Bos Iaf, Sabanci University, Kasa Art Gallery, Istanbul 2008
Re-orientations, European Parliament, Brussels, 2008
Rafia Gallery, Damascus, 2009
Arabicity, Bluecoat Arts Centre, Liverpool and Beirut Exhibition Center, 2010
Nujoom: Constellations of Arab art, The Farjam Collection at Dubai International Financial Centre, Dubai, 2010
 The Future of a Promise, 54th Venice Biennale, 2012
 Re-orientations II, Rose Issa Projects, London 2012
Traits d’Union – Paris et l’art contemporain arabe, Villa Emerige, Paris, 2011
Art is the answer! Contemporary Lebanese artists and designers, Villa Empain, Brussels, 2012
Ourouba: The eye of Lebanon, Beirut Art Fair, 2017
 Across Boundaries. Focus on Lebanese Photography, curated by Tarek Nahas, Beirut Art Fair 2018
 Arabicity, MEI Gallery Washington DC, 2019

References

External links
•	Website of Ayman Baalbaki
•	Ayman Baalbaki Profile

Lebanese painters
1975 births
Living people
Lebanese contemporary artists